James Fagan may refer to:
 James Fagan (farmer-politician) (1812–1868), Irish-born farmer who spent two terms as a Wisconsin state assemblyman
 James Fagan (MP) (1800–1869), Irish Repeal Association politician and timber merchant
 James Fagan (musician) (born 1972), folk musician from Sydney, Australia
 James Fleming Fagan (1828–1893), farmer, public official, and general in the Confederate States Army
 James H. Fagan (born 1947), American attorney and politician in the Massachusetts House of Representatives
 J. B. Fagan (1873–1933), Irish-born actor, theatre manager, producer and playwright in England
 Jim Fagan (1882–1948), Australian rules footballer